Island Council elections were held in the Caribbean Netherlands on 15 March 2023 to elect the members of the Island council. The elections were held on the same day as the electoral college elections in the Caribbean Netherlands, and the provincial and water board elections in the European Netherlands.

See also 

 2023 Dutch Senate election

References 

2023 elections in the Caribbean
Island council
March 2023 events in North America
Elections in Bonaire
Elections in Saba (island)
Elections in Sint Eustatius